Sirsa is a town and a nagar panchayat in Allahabad district in the Indian state of Uttar Pradesh.

Geography
United village of PARVA (u.v.p) has an average elevation of 36
metres. It is the biggest
town area in Allahabad district. The
town has a huge religious
importance, being on the bank of
the River Ganges area.
U.V.P is a village in
Uruwan Tehsil in Allahabad District
of Uttar Pradesh State, India. It
belongs to Allahabad Division. It
is located 49 km to the east of
District headquarters Allahabad.
13 km from Uruwan. 253 km from
State capital Lucknow
Parva Uparhar Pin code is 212305
and postal head office is Sirsa.
Bhabhaura Uparhar (2 km), Tela
Khas (3.2 km), Madara Mukundpur
Uparhar (2 km), Kaneda Uparhar
(3 km), Javaniya (4.2 km) are the
nearby villages to Parva Uparhar.
united village of parva is surrounded by
Handia Tehsil to the north, 
Uruwan Tehsil to the west, 
Saidabad Tehsil to the north, 
Meja Tehsil to the south.
Phulpur, Mirzapur, Allahabad, 
Jaunpur are the nearby cities to u.V.p

Population
Of 2011 India census, [2] united village of parva had
a population of 1699. Males
constitute 53% of the population
and females 47%. u.v.p has an
average literacy rate of 76%, higher
than the national average of 59.5%:
male literacy is 77%, and female
literacy is 54%. In u.v.p, 14% of the
population is under 6 years of age.

References

Cities and towns in Allahabad district